Carpatolechia notatella, the sallow-leaf groundling, is a moth of the family Gelechiidae. It is found in most of Europe (except the Iberian Peninsula and most of the Balkan Peninsula) and Turkey.

The wingspan is .The head is  whitish, grey sprinkled. Terminal joint of palpi as long as second. Fore wings whitish-grey, brownish-tinged in disc, suffusedly irrorated
with dark grey, with a few black scales; darker spots on costa near base and before and beyond middle, and on tornns; a black dot at base of dorsum, and two in disc rather near base stigmata black, first discal beyond plical, preceded by a black dot, another black dot beneath second discal. Hindwings 1, grey. The larva is pale grey-greenish; head black; plate of 2 black posteriorly.

Adults have been recorded on wing from May to June.

The larvae feed on Salix species (including Salix caprea, Salix aurita, Salix petrandra, Salix cinerea, Salix repens and Salix alba). They feed on the parenchyma on the underside of the leaves. Larvae can be found from August to September.

References

Moths described in 1813
Carpatolechia
Moths of Europe
Moths of Asia